Several special routes of U.S. Route 20 exist. In order from west to east they are as follows.

Existing

Toledo business loop

In Toledo, Oregon, U.S. Route 20 Business runs from an intersection with the main highway west of Toledo on the Toledo Frontage Road and 5th Street through Toledo and again on the Toledo Frontage Road to an intersection with the main highway east of Toledo.  Business 20 in Toledo is also called Sharon Branstiter Memorial Drive, in memory of Toledo's former mayor.

Bend business loop

In Bend, Oregon, U.S. Route 20 Business runs from an intersection with the main highway north of Bend, south on East 1st Street, Deschutes Place, and Wall Street to Newport Avenue, concurrent with U.S. 97 Business, and then east on Newport Avenue and Greenwood Avenue to the main highway concurrent with East 3rd Avenue in Bend.

Idaho Falls business loop

U.S. Route 20 Business in Idaho Falls is overlapped by US 26. It begins at I-15 Exit 118 on West Broadway Street, and runs concurrent with the Interstate 15 Business Loop until the intersection with Yellowstone Avenue, where BL-15 turns south and US 20 BUS/US 26  turns north. Curving under a set of railroad bridges, the street name briefly changes to the Northgate Mile. The concurrency with US 26 ends when US 20 BUS turns north onto North Holmes Avenue, while US 26 continues along North Yellowstone Highway. The railroad line that the route previously ran under is encountered again at the intersection with East Anderson Street, where the tracks cross from the southwest corner to the northeast corner. A while after crossing a bridge over South Fork Willow Creek, North Holmes Avenue intersects 29th Road North, and suddenly gains the additional name of Lewisville Road. US 20 BUS ends at the diamond interchange with US 20 (Rigby Highway), known as Exit 310.

St. Anthony business loop

In St. Anthony, Idaho, U.S. Route 20 Business begins at Exit 346 on US 20 and proceeds northward onto Bridge Avenue. After crossing the Henrys Fork, the route enters the St. Anthony downtown area. Once through the downtown area, it turns to the east on the Yellowstone Highway. US 20 Business continues to the east, crossing the Henrys Fork again, before bending to the southwest and ending at an intersection with mainline US 20.

Casper business loop

Douglas business loop

Sioux City business loop

U.S. Route 20 Business in the Sioux City area originates in Nebraska, at the junction of Dakota Avenue and Interstate 129 in South Sioux City.  US 20 Bus. follows US 20s old alignment through South Sioux City before crossing into Iowa concurrently with U.S. Route 77.  US 20 Bus. then joins with Interstate 29, for a very short distance before exiting onto Virginia Street and then Gordon Drive. US 20 Bus. westbound traffic does not join I-29, but skips it though a system of ramps. The route then follows Gordon Drive through central Sioux City to the US 20/US 75 bypass, where it rejoins US 20.  US 20 Bus. in Sioux City is known officially as Iowa Highway 12, though Iowa 12 is signed as ending at Interstate 29 in western Sioux City.

Fort Dodge business loop

In the Fort Dodge area, U.S. Route 20 Business begins at the western end of the current US 20 expressway near Moorland and follows US 20's former route through the city via Kenyon Road and 5th Avenue South.  Just east of Fort Dodge's eastern city limits, US 20 Bus. turns south on Webster County Road P59, passing through several gypsum mining areas before rejoining the US 20 expressway in Coalville.

Freeport business loop

Business U.S. Route 20 is a business route of U.S. 20 around Freeport, Illinois. In 1988, U.S. 20 was rerouted away from Freeport after a bypass was completed.
The former routing that ran through downtown Freeport along Galena Avenue and South Street became Business U.S. 20.
The bypass was initially completed as two-lanes with earthworks completed for four-lanes. The segment east of Illinois Route 26 was completed as four-lane in the early 1900s with the segment west of Illinois Route 26 completed in the late 1990s.

Rockford–Belvidere business loop

The longest Business U.S. Route 20 in Illinois runs 21 miles (34 km) from just west of Rockford to just east of Belvidere. The route begins just west of Weldon Road and runs as State Street into downtown Rockford, where it is split into two one-way streets (Chestnut Street, Walnut Street and First Avenue for eastbound traffic, with Jefferson Street and Kilburn Avenue for westbound traffic). The route continues east along State Street all the way through Rockford and becomes a two-lane highway between Rockford and Belvidere. Business 20 is then routed in an outer loop around the city of Belvidere before merging back with U.S. 20 near Genoa Road and Interstate 90 (Jane Addams Memorial Tollway) as Belvidere Road.

South Bend business loop

Business U.S. 20 follows the former route of U.S. 20 through South Bend and Mishawaka, generally along Colfax Avenune and McKinley Avenue/McKinley Highway. Signage is inconsistent along parts of the route.

Ohio alternate route

The western terminus of the route is at US 20 south of Pioneer, and the eastern terminus is at US 20 in Maumee, southwest of Toledo. The route runs parallel to the Ohio Turnpike (Interstate 80/Interstate 90, I-80/I-90) for much of its length, and intersects the turnpike at exit 13 northeast of Montpelier in Holiday City. The highway was previously designated US 20S.

Silver Creek truck route

U.S. Route 20 Truck is a truck route of US 20 in Silver Creek, New York. The road begins at an intersection with US 20 in Silver Creek, goes along Central Avenue for a short time and merges in with NY 5. The two become concurrent for another mile on Howard Street where US 20 Truck ends at an intersection with US 20.

New York alternate route

It leaves US 20 in Hamburg, a suburb of Buffalo, and rejoins it in East Bloomfield about five miles (8 km) west of Canandaigua, the county seat of Ontario County. While the main line of US 20 takes a direct path between Hamburg, Buffalo, and East Bloomfield via Avon, US 20A veers to the south to serve several villages and hamlets, including the villages of Geneseo and Warsaw. US 20A was assigned ca. 1939.

Former

Idaho alternate route

Elgin business loop

U.S. Route 20 Business was a business loop along a former route of US 20 in Elgin, Illinois. The route began as Villa Street at a junction with US 20 Elgin Bypass in Southeast Elgin. Following Villa Street into downtown, it turned North briefly as Villa Court. Through downtown, Westbound traffic followed Center Street for one block to take Highland Avenue across the Fox River. Eastbound traffic turned from Highland Avenue onto State Street for one block to take Chicago Street across the river to Villa Court. West of State Street, both directions of traffic followed Highland Avenue and Larkin Avenue to the other end of the Elgin Bypass.
This special route was created when US 20 was rerouted to the Elgin Bypass in 1962. The route was decommissioned in 1984.

Chicago business loop

U.S. Route 20 City was created in 1938 to roughly follow the former alignment of US 20 through Chicago while the main highway was routed around the city. From US 20 at the intersection of Lake Street and Mannheim Road, the city route went East on Lake Street. At Harlem Avenue it turned South to continue East on Washington Boulevard. At Garfield Park the route split, Eastbound traffic followed Warren Boulevard while Westbound traffic followed Washington Boulevard. Initially, opposing traffic traveled together on Washington Boulevard from Union Park to the South Branch Chicago River where it followed Wacker Drive to Michigan Avenue. When Chicago changed many downtown streets to one-way in 1955, Eastbound traffic followed Washington Boulevard while Westbound traffic followed Randolph Street. The route followed both streets to Michigan Avenue for four years before returning to Wacker Drive. At Michigan Avenue, the route joined U.S. Route 12 City to head South. The original route took 16th Street one block East to Indiana Avenue and thence to Cermak Road. In 1958, Eastbound traffic continued on Michigan to Cermak while Westbound traffic followed Indiana Avenue to 14th Street. The route followed Cermak Road to a short diagonal named Silverton Way to South Parkway (now Martin Luther King Drive). From there, the route followed Oakwood, Drexel, and Hyde Park Boulevards to Jackson Park. Traversing the park on what came to be known as part of Cornell Drive (Avenue), the route continued South on Stony Island Avenue, rejoining US 20 at 95th Street.
In 1960, this route was redesignated as U.S. Route 20 Business. The eastern end of the route was moved in 1963 to the Chicago Skyway as Toll Business U.S. Route 20 to rejoin the main highway at Indianapolis Boulevard at the state line. The route was decommissioned in 1968.

South Bend bypass

Bypass U.S. 20 was the designation for the portion of the St. Joseph Valley Parkway during the period when it was only open between US 31 south of South Bend and US 20 to the west. When the freeway was extended north and US 31 was rerouted onto it, the Bypass 20 designation was removed. When the freeway was completed to the east reconnecting to US 20, the mainline US 20 designation was transferred to it, rather than the Bypass 20 designation being reapplied to it.

Osceola–Elkhart truck route

US 20N

US 20N was the designation for US 20 in northwest Ohio between the endpoints of US 20S during the period when that route existed (see Ohio alternate route section above). In 1932, US 20N was established and acquired part of US 20 between Bridgewater Township and Maumee. By 1935, US 20N was decommissioned and was reverted to US 20.

Western Greater Cleveland alternate route

From 1971 to 1983, U.S. Route 20 Alternate ran concurrently with the current Alternate U.S. 6 from their common eastern terminus in the Ohio City neighborhood in Cleveland to U.S. 20/SR 113 in Rocky River.

Eastern Greater Cleveland alternate route

U.S. Route 20 Alternate ran along Euclid Avenue, with Alternate U.S. 6, in Cleveland and East Cleveland from 1936 until 1967, when U.S. 20 was removed from U.S. 6 and run along Euclid Avenue from Superior Avenue in East Cleveland to Public Square in Cleveland.

References

20
U.S. Route 20
20
20
20
S20
20
20
20
20